Felix Scott is a British actor who has played the role of Charlie Thomas in the BBC Radio 4 soap The Archers since 2014.

He has also appeared in the television series Holby City, Doc Martin, Wolf Hall, No Offence, and Missing, as well as in the 2010 film Inception.

In 2017 he starred along Ayesha Antoine in the play "Dirty Great Love Story" at the Arts Theatre in London.

He portrays Buzz Aldrin in The Crown.

He portrays Patrick Nash in Miss Scarlet and the Duke.

References

External links

Year of birth missing (living people)
Living people
British male actors